GMJ may refer to:

 Ghana Medical Journal
 Glasgow Mathematical Journal
 Grove Municipal Airport, Oklahoma